dial tone is a tone on a phone indicating that the line is operational

Dial Tone (G.I. Joe)
Dial Tones, fictional band in Happy Days (musical)
"Dial Tones", song by As It Is from the album Never Happy, Ever After